Campus School is a public English medium senior secondary co-educational school situated in the Chaudhary Charan Singh Haryana Agricultural University (CCS HAU) campus, in Hisar, India. Established in 1971, it caters to the children of CCS HAU employees and students from nearby areas.

History
The school was inaugurated on 14 November 1971 by the then Finance Minister, Om Prakash Jain. Mrs. S. Verma was the first principal. The school received Central Board of Secondary Education (CBSE) accreditation in July 1972.
The school has a big open-air theatre and a big auditorium, mainly, used for prayers.

Notable alumni
 Arvind Kejriwal, social activist, Chief Minister of Delhi and Ramon Magsaysay Award winner 
 Naveen Jindal, former Member of Parliament, current Chairman of Jindal Steel and Power Limited and Chancellor of O. P. Jindal Global University
Pawan Chopra actor
Saina Nehwal, winner of World Junior Badminton Championship, Indonesia Open, Singapore Open and Rajiv Gandhi Khel Ratna award
Sugandh Rakha angel investor
Yash Tonk, movie and TV actor

See also

 List of schools in Hisar
 List of universities and colleges in Hisar
 List of institutions of higher education in Haryana

References

External links
Official website of CCS HAU, Hisar

Schools in Hisar (city)
Schools in Haryana